The 1989 Bristol Open was a men's tennis tournament played on grass courts in Bristol in England that was part of the 1989 Nabisco Grand Prix. It was the tenth and last edition of the tournament and was held from 19 to 26 June 1989. Fourth-seeded Eric Jelen won the singles title.

Finals

Singles

 Eric Jelen defeated  Nick Brown 6–4, 3–6, 7–5
 It was Jelen's only singles title of his career.

Doubles

 Paul Chamberlin /  Tim Wilkison defeated  Mike De Palmer /  Gary Donnelly 7–6, 6–4
 It was Chamberlin's only title of the year and the 1st of his career. It was Wilkison's 1st title of the year and the 15th of his career.

References

External links
 ITF tournament edition details